The Super 6 Baseball and Softball is a tournament between national baseball teams in Europe, governed by the Confederation of European Baseball (CEB), the European Softball Federation (ESF) and the World Baseball Softball Confederation (WBSC). It was held for the first and only time from September 18 to 23, 2018 in Hoofddorp, Netherlands. It was organized by the Royal Dutch Baseball and Softball Association (KNBSB), the City of Hoofddorp and the local baseball club Hoofddorp Pioniers. It was featured by the top 6 nations of the 2016 European Championship and ESF Women's Championship.

Baseball

Teams
The top six teams of the 2016 European Championship qualified automatically for the tournament.

Rosters

Qualification round

Standings

Day 1

Day 2

Day 3

Day 4

Day 5

Final

Statistics leaders

Batting

* Minimum 2.7 plate appearances per game

Pitching

* Minimum 1.0 inning pitched per game

Baseball results

Softball results

Medal table

Baseball

Softball

See also
European Baseball Championship
ESF Women's Championship
European Cup (baseball)
European Champion Cup Final Four

References

External links
Official site
Baseball results site

 
International baseball competitions in Europe
WBSC Europe competitions